Stephen Francis Henderson (born 2 May 1988) is an Irish professional footballer who plays as a goalkeeper. He is currently a free agent.

Club career

Early career
Born in Dublin, Henderson began his youth career with Belvedere before joining Aston Villa in 2005 at the age of 17. He progressed through the Villa youth system before signing his first professional contract on 5 May 2006.

Bristol City
Henderson agreed to join newly promoted Championship club Bristol City on 30 May 2007 on a one-year contract starting on 1 July, when his contract with Aston Villa expired. He made his debut against Queens Park Rangers on 11 August 2007, coming on as a substitute in the second half. He joined Conference Premier club York City on a one-month loan on 31 August 2007. He made seven appearances during his spell with the club. He joined Weymouth of the Conference Premier on a one-month loan on 29 February 2008 and spent the rest of the 2007–08 season with the club, making 16 appearances. He was offered a new deal with City in May 2008. Henderson came on as a substitute in the ninth minute against Ipswich Town on 13 April 2009 and manager Gary Johnson said he "did really well".

He almost joined League One club Wycombe Wanderers on loan until the end of 2009–10 on 25 January 2010, before eventually signing for League Two club Aldershot Town on an initial one-month loan on 1 February 2010. On 17 September 2010, Henderson joined Yeovil Town on a 30-day emergency loan, making his debut on 18 September in a 4–2 away defeat to Huddersfield Town. On 3 January 2011, Henderson re-joined Yeovil on loan for the remainder of the season and subsequently kept a clean sheet on his return against Brentford.

Portsmouth

On 8 July 2011, Henderson joined Portsmouth on a three-year contract, citing his reasons for leaving Bristol City as frustration at his lack of first-team opportunities. Henderson was back-up goalkeeper for Jamie Ashdown until Ashdown's loss of form. He made his Portsmouth debut at Leeds United in a 1–0 defeat on 1 October 2011 and then kept his first clean sheet for Portsmouth in a 2–0 victory over Barnsley at Fratton Park on 15 October. Since making his debut, Henderson established himself as Portsmouth's first choice goalkeeper ahead of Ashdown.

West Ham United
On 16 March 2012, Henderson joined Championship rivals West Ham United on an emergency loan from Portsmouth until the end of the season. He was unused substitute for the 2012 Championship play-off Final, a result that ensured West Ham made an immediate return to the Premier League.

On 21 May 2012, Henderson joined West Ham permanently on a three-year contract for an undisclosed fee. He made his first-team debut for West Ham on 28 August 2012 against Crewe Alexandra in the League Cup. West Ham won the match 2–0. He joined Championship club Ipswich Town on a three-month loan on 16 October 2012 and made his debut in a 2–1 defeat at Hull City on 20 October. He made 16 appearances for Ipswich, and re-signed for the club on loan for the rest of the season on 31 January 2013. He was recalled to West Ham on 21 March 2013.

In October 2013 Henderson signed for AFC Bournemouth on a three-month loan as cover for the suspended first choice goalkeeper Ryan Allsop and the injured second choice goalkeeper, Darryl Flahavan. In the second game of his loan spell, an away game against Nottingham Forest, Henderson dislocated his shoulder after colliding with Forest's Simon Cox. He returned to West Ham for treatment for the injury which was expected to keep him out of football for six months. He left West Ham by mutual consent in July 2014.

Charlton Athletic
Henderson signed for Championship club Charlton Athletic on a three-year contract on 21 July 2014.

Nottingham Forest
On 22 July 2016, Henderson signed for Championship club Nottingham Forest on a three-year contract.

On 31 January 2018, Henderson rejoined League One club Portsmouth on loan until the end of the 2017–18 season.

On 4 December 2018, Henderson joined League One club Wycombe Wanderers on an initial seven-day emergency loan, which was then extended by another seven days on 12 December and then again until Christmas Day the week after.

Crystal Palace
In July 2019, he joined Crystal Palace on a season-long deal following his release from Nottingham Forest. He signed a contract extension in August 2020. He was released at the end of the 2020–21 season.

Return to Charlton Athletic
On 7 September 2021, Henderson returned to Charlton Athletic on a one-year deal.

On 10 May 2022, it was confirmed that Henderson would leave Charlton Athletic when his contract expired.

International career
Henderson was capped by the Republic of Ireland at under-16, under-17 and under-19 level. He made his under-21s debut as a substitute in a 3–2 defeat away to Sweden in October 2007. He finished his under-21 career with eight caps.

Henderson was called up to the senior national team for a February 2012 friendly match against the Czech Republic, for which he was an unused substitute.

Personal life
Henderson comes from a noted Irish goalkeeping family, his grandfather Paddy, his father, also Stephen, along with his two uncles, Dave and Wayne, are all former goalkeepers.

Career statistics

References

External links

Stephen Henderson profile at the Nottingham Forest F.C. website
Stephen Henderson profile at the Football Association of Ireland website

Ireland profile at Soccerscene

1988 births
Living people
Association footballers from Dublin (city)
Republic of Ireland association footballers
Republic of Ireland youth international footballers
Republic of Ireland under-21 international footballers
Republic of Ireland expatriate association footballers
Association football goalkeepers
Belvedere F.C. players
Aston Villa F.C. players
Bristol City F.C. players
York City F.C. players
Weymouth F.C. players
Aldershot Town F.C. players
Yeovil Town F.C. players
Portsmouth F.C. players
West Ham United F.C. players
Ipswich Town F.C. players
AFC Bournemouth players
Charlton Athletic F.C. players
Nottingham Forest F.C. players
Wycombe Wanderers F.C. players
English Football League players
National League (English football) players
Expatriate footballers in England
Irish expatriate sportspeople in England
Crystal Palace F.C. players
Stephen